Michael Greenspan (born 1974) is a Canadian film director best known for his premiere film, the psychological thriller Wrecked, which debuted at the 2010 Abu Dhabi Film Festival and starred Academy Award-winning actor Adrien Brody and actress Caroline Dhavernas.

Early life 
Greenspan, who has no known genetic or biological relationship with former Federal Reserve chairman Alan Greenspan, was born and raised in Montreal, Quebec. From a young age he had a passion for theater and made several short films for fun in his youth. Upon attaining manhood, he moved to Toronto and attend York University's film program. He later moved to Los Angeles to pursue his film career further, where he made his first film ("The Legend of Razorback") and won first place at the Temecula Valley International Film Festival.

Film career 
Greenspan's first 25-minute short film, The Legend of Razorback, won first place at the Temecula Valley International Film Festival. He subsequently collaborated with then-U.S. Senator Christopher Dodd on his first feature-length film, Wrecked, which was released in 2010 at the Abu Dhabi Film Festival. The film was subsequently picked Up by IFC Midnight, a genre fiction label of IFC Films, and distributed nationally in the United States in 2011.

He subsequently directed the thriller film Kill For Me, starring Katie Cassidy, Donal Logue, and Tracy Spiridakos. The film, which was loosely inspired by Strangers on a Train and Single White Female, was released direct-to-video on February 12, 2013.

In addition to his career as a film maker, he teaches at Columbia University. He also teaches film directing at the Los Angeles Film School. He also teaches filmmaking at elementary schools across Los Angeles, and a 6th grade class on early Jewish settlement in North America.

Awards and honors

Filmography

References

External links 

1974 births
Living people
York University alumni
Artists from Montreal
Film directors from Montreal
Writers from Montreal
AFI Conservatory alumni
Canadian male screenwriters
Horror film directors
21st-century Canadian screenwriters
Lecturers
21st-century Canadian educators
Canadian film educators